LEARFIELD, formerly Learfield IMG College, is a large collegiate sports marketing company, representing more than 200 of the nation's top collegiate properties including the NCAA and its 89 championships, NCAA Football, leading conferences, and many of the most prestigious colleges and universities in the country. Headquartered in Plano, Texas, LEARFIELD employs more than 2,200 people in nearly 100 offices throughout the United States. The company was created in 2018 through the combination of Endeavor's IMG College division and Learfield Communications of Missouri, managed by the Atairos Group.

IMG College was formed from the acquisition of Host Communications and The Collegiate Licensing Company in 2007. Additionally ISP Sports was acquired in 2010.

In 2012, a joint venture with Learfield created IMG Learfield Ticket Solutions, now representing 30 universities in outsourced ticketing. Additionally, IMG College Seating, the largest premium cushion stadium seat provider in college athletics, now represents more than 90 universities nationwide, managing more than 500,000 college football stadium seats annually.

The IMG College Audio Network consists of more than 2,100 radio stations airing primarily football and men's basketball games along with weekly call-in coaches' shows.  The media network also includes over 100 television stations airing weekly half hour coaches' shows for most of the universities represented by the company.  IMG Audio produces more than 35,000 hours of college sports programming annually for these affiliate stations.

Host Communications was founded in 1974 and created one of the first college sports multimedia contracts with its creation of a radio network for the University of Kentucky. ISP Sports was founded in 1992 in Winston-Salem, North Carolina providing sports marketing and broadcast services for collegiate athletics across the United States.  In addition to the Winston-Salem headquarters, the company operates more than 90 regional offices.

The organization also co-owns the Longhorn Network and Campus Insiders, the latter through which it holds a stake in 120 Sports.

Leadership
 Cole Gahagan, CEO
Ben C. Sutton, Jr., chairman and president, IMG College 
Jim Connelly, senior vice president, special projects
Mark Dyer, senior vice president, business ventures
Lou Doherty, senior vice president and general counsel
Joe Potter, senior vice president, operations
Roger VanDerSnick, chief sales and marketing officer
Andrew Judelson, senior vice president, national sales
Rick Barakat, vice president, sales strategy and operations
Andrew Giangola, vice president, strategic communications

Markets and schools
At the conference level, IMG represents The American, A10, Big 12, Conference USA, Horizon League, MAC, MEAC, OVC, SEC and WCC, and also individually represents the NCAA, the Heisman Trophy and 26 Bowl games. The company also maintains the IMG Academy in Bradenton, Florida, an athletics-focused preparatory school.

IMG represents more than 90 universities in multi-media rights and more than 200 universities in trademark licensing, including, but not limited to:
Air Force
Akron
Alabama
Appalachian State
Arizona
Arkansas
Auburn
Baylor
Boston College
Bradley
BYU
California
Central Michigan
Charlotte
Cincinnati
Clemson
Connecticut
Delaware
Drake
Duke
East Carolina
Elon
Evansville
Florida
Florida A&M
Florida Atlantic
Florida State
Furman
George Washington
Georgia
Georgia State
Georgia Southern
Georgia Tech
Gonzaga
Houston
Idaho
Illinois
Illinois State
Indiana
Iowa
Iowa State
Kansas
Kansas State
Kent State
Louisiana
Louisiana Tech
Louisville
Loyola Chicago
Marquette
Marshall
Miami (FL)
Miami (OH)
Michigan
Minnesota
Mississippi State
Missouri
Missouri State
Nebraska
Nevada
Northern Illinois
Northern Iowa
Notre Dame
Ohio
Ohio State
Oklahoma State
Ole Miss
Oregon
Penn State
Pittsburgh
Rhode Island
Rice
Richmond
Rutgers
Saint Louis
St. John's
South Alabama
South Carolina
Southern Illinois
Southern Miss
Syracuse
TCU
Tennessee
Texas
Texas Tech
Troy
Tulane
UAB
UCF
UCLA
UNC Greensboro
UNC Wilmington
University of Oklahoma
UNLV
USF
Utah
UTEP
Vanderbilt
Villanova
Virginia Tech
Wake Forest
Washington
Washington State
West Virginia
Western Kentucky
Wisconsin–Madison
Wofford
Youngstown State

See also
List of Virginia Tech IMG Sports Network stations
Syracuse ISP Sports Network

References

Sports radio in the United States
Companies based in Winston-Salem, North Carolina
Akron Zips
Houston Cougars
Virginia Tech Hokies
Notre Dame Fighting Irish football announcers